Udea hageni is a moth in the family Crambidae. It was described by Viette in 1952. It is endemic to the Mid-Atlantic Ridge island of Tristan da Cunha.

References

Moths described in 1952
hageni